Huang Yu-shin (born 26 November 1971) is a Taiwanese judoka. She competed in the women's extra-lightweight event at the 1992 Summer Olympics.

References

1971 births
Living people
Taiwanese female judoka
Olympic judoka of Taiwan
Judoka at the 1992 Summer Olympics
Place of birth missing (living people)
Asian Games medalists in judo
Judoka at the 1990 Asian Games
Judoka at the 1994 Asian Games
Asian Games bronze medalists for Chinese Taipei
Medalists at the 1990 Asian Games
Medalists at the 1994 Asian Games
Taiwanese female sport wrestlers
World Wrestling Championships medalists
20th-century Taiwanese women